Kate Mulvany  (born 24 February 1977) is an Australian actress, playwright and screenwriter. She works in theatre, television and film, with roles in Hunters  (2020–2023), The Great Gatsby (2013), Griff the Invisible (2010) and The Final Winter (2007). She has played lead roles with Australian theatre companies as well as appearing on television and in film. In 2004 she won the Philip Parsons Young Playwrights Award for The Seed. In 2017, she won the Helpmann Award for Best Female Actor in a Play for her role in Richard 3.

Career
Mulvany has played Cassius, Lady Macbeth, and was lauded for her performance as Richard III in which she revealed her real-life spinal disability. Her adaptation of Craig Silvey’s novel Jasper Jones has been performed in Perth by Barking Gecko Theatre Company, in Sydney by Belvoir St Theatre, and in Melbourne by the Melbourne Theatre Company. In 2015 it was shortlisted for the Nick Enright Prize for Playwriting, New South Wales Premier's Literary Awards.

In 2018, Mulvany adapted Ruth Park's The Harp in the South trilogy as a two-part play for Sydney Theatre Company. In 2019, she followed this with an adaptation of the Schiller play Mary Stuart - the first to be undertaken by a woman - again for Sydney Theatre Company. One review said, "Mulvany’s bold adaptation recentres the queens, shearing away nearly every male soliloquy and interaction held exclusively between men, of which there are an abundance in Schiller’s text", while others called it "dazzlingly different", and a "feminist" reimagining of a classic.

In April 2019, Deadline announced that Mulvany had been cast as a series regular in Amazon Prime Video's new 10-episode Nazi-hunting series Hunters, created by David Weil and produced by Jordan Peele. She played one of the Hunters, Sister Harriet,

Early life
Kate Mulvany's father, Danny, was a Vietnam Veteran. Her mother, Glenys, is a schoolteacher. She has a sister, Tegan, who is an actor and an improvisor. In 1997, Mulvany received her Bachelor of Arts degree from Curtin University, Perth.

Mulvany was diagnosed with a Wilms's tumor (renal cancer) at age two and spent much of her childhood in the hospital. Her cancer has been linked to her father's exposure to Agent Orange during his service in the Vietnam War.

Personal life
Mulvany was partner to actor Mark Priestley. In 2015 she wed fellow actor Hamish Michael in New York. She is an ambassador for MiVAC (Mines, Victims and Clearance), a landmine advocacy and support group.

Filmography

Film
Elvis (2022) as Marion Keisker
The Merger (2018) as Angie Barlow
The Little Death (2014) as Evie
The Turning (2013) as Gail Lang
The Great Gatsby (2013) as Mrs McKee
Griff the Invisible (2010) as Cecilia

Television
The Clearing (TBC) TV series; In production
The Twelve (2022) as Kate Lawson
Hunters (2020–2023) as Sister Harriet
Lambs of God (2019) as Frankie
Fighting Season (2018) as Captain Kim Nordenfelt
Secret City (2016) as Ronnie
Winter (2015) as Lauren McIntyre

Awards and recognition

As actor

As writer

Other 
In 2017, Mulvany received an honorary doctorate from Curtin University for her services to the arts in Australia and she was awarded the Medal of the Order of Australia (OAM) in the 2020 Australia Day Honours for "service to the performing arts". She also received the 2020 Mona Brand Award, worth $35,000 which is "presented to a woman who has a body of outstanding work which displays broad array and which has been widely performed or screened to critical acclaim".

References

External links 
 
 

1977 births
Living people
21st-century Australian actresses
Australian film actresses
Australian television actresses
Australian stage actresses
Australian screenwriters
Helpmann Award winners
Recipients of the Medal of the Order of Australia